Kerouac's Last Dream is an album by American folk musician Ramblin' Jack Elliott, released in 1981.

In his liner notes, Elliott writes "I have been asked, sometimes, why I don't learn new songs. These are old ones and I have sung them for a long time. They are good and I think they shall always be good."

Kerouac's Last Dream was reissued on CD in 1997 on the Appleseed label with additional material from the same 1980 sessions for a German LP release.

Reception

Music critic William Ruhlman, writing for AllMusic, stated: "Ramblin' Jack Elliott is not primarily a recording artist, he's a folksinger, and these are the songs he sings."

Michael Perryl of No Depression wrote: "The bare-bones best of Kerouac’s Last Dream? All those stories. We may have little in common with buffalo skinners, massacred miners, cowboys, and World War I foot soldiers, or even the folkies and beats of “912 Greens”, but when Ramblin’ Jack sings their stories, I am refreshed to find some universal resonance with travelers who have started our stories for us, rather than hearing one more time that we’re all jes’ good ol’ boys and girls livin’ fer Friday night. Kerouac’s Last Dream is a simple, solid collection…unadorned and necessary, y’might even say."

Track listing

Original track listing
"Buffalo Skinners" (Traditional)
"Pretty Boy Floyd" (Woody Guthrie)
"Cup of Coffee" (Jack Elliott)
"Roving Gambler" (Traditional)
"Blue Eyes Crying in the Rain" (Fred Rose)
"The Cuckoo" (Traditional)
"Talkin' Fishin'" (Guthrie)
"1913 Massacre" (Guthrie)
 "Carpenter"
"912 Greens" (Elliott)

Reissue track listing
"Pretty Boy Floyd" (Woody Guthrie) – 4:00
"Blue Eyes Crying in the Rain" (Fred Rose) – 3:11
"Freight Train Blues" (Traditional) – 3:43
"Talkin' Fishin'" (Guthrie) – 3:36
"Roving Gambler" (Traditional) – 3:50
"The Cuckoo" (Traditional) – 3:40
"Don't Think Twice, It's All Right" (Bob Dylan) – 3:40
"Soldiers Last Letter" (Ernest Tubb, Redd Stewart) – 3:04
"1913 Massacre" (Guthrie) – 5:04
"Buffalo Skinners" (Traditional) – 5:15
"Night Herding Song" (Traditional  2:51
"Mean Mama Blues" (Mitchell & Mulligan) – 2:25
"I Threw It All Away" (Dylan) – 3:42
"Detour" (Paul Westmoreland) – 2:13
"Ridin' Down the Canyon" (Gene Autry, Smiley Burnette) – 5:33
"Cup of Coffee" (Jack Elliott) – 4:10
"912 Greens" (Elliott) – 10:10

Personnel
Ramblin' Jack Elliott – vocals, guitar
Technical
Günter Pauler - engineer
Jerken Diederich - cover design
Harmut Rosen - cover photography

References

External links
Ramblin' Jack Elliott Discography

1981 albums
Ramblin' Jack Elliott albums